The 1985 Pan American Men's Handball Championship was the fourth edition of the tournament, held in Manaus, Brazil from 28 October to 3 November 1984. It acted as the American qualifying tournament for the 1986 World Championship, where the top placed team qualied.

Standings

Results

External links
Results on todor66.com

Pan American Men's Handball Championship
Pan American Men's Championship
Pan American Men's Handball Championship
International handball competitions hosted by Brazil
Pan American Men's Handball Championship